Nové Město nad Metují is a town in Náchod District in the Hradec Králové Region of the Czech Republic. It has about 9,100 inhabitants. The historic town centre is well preserved and is protected by law as an urban monument reservation.

Administrative parts
The town part of Krčín and villages of Spy and Vrchoviny are administrative parts of Nové Město nad Metují.

Etymology

The name which literally means "New Town on the Metuje".

Geography
It lies on the border of the Orlice Table and Podrolická Uplands. The old town and the castle lie on a rocky promontory in a meander of the river Metuje, hence the name.

History

The oldest inhabited part of Nové Město nad Metují is Krčín. An old Slavic settlement was in the territory of Krčín in the 7th and 8th centuries. The Krčín village was probably founded in the 13th century and first documented in the first half of the 14th century. After Nové Město nad Metují was founded, it became part of the Nové Město nad Metují manor.

Nové Město nad Metují was founded by Jan Černčický of Kácov on 10 August 1501. It was destroyed by fire in 1526. In 1527, the manor was acquired by the Pernštejn family. In 1527–1548, most of the houses on the square were then reconstructed in uniform Renaissance and late Gothic design. The elementary ground plan was kept. The connected gables, so-called swallow tails, gave the town the appearance of the northern Italian Renaissance. The castle was also rebuilt.

From 1548 to 1621, the manor was owned by Lords of Stubenberk, who expanded the castle. Albrecht von Wallenstein purchased the town in 1623, then it passed to the Trčkas of Lípa. After the assassination of Albrecht von Wallenstein and Adam Erdman Trčka in 1634, their properties were confiscated and Nové Město nad Metují manor received Walter Leslie, the main initiator of the assassination.

Walter Leslie has rebuilt the castle in the Baroque style. The Leslie family owned the manor until 1802, when the last member of the family died, and Nové Město nad Metují was inherited by the Dietrichstein family. The Dietrichstein family owned it until 1858.

After the revolution and administrative reform of the Austrian Empire in 1848, Nové Město nad Metují became independent of the nobility. From 1849 to 1949, Krčín was a separate municipality.

Demographics

Economy
Nové Město nad Metují is a town with tradition in engineering, printing, textile and food industry. The town is known for watch-making production under the brand PRIM. The largest employers based in the town are Ammann Czech Republic, manufacturer of construction machinery, and Hronovský s.r.o., manufacturer of car parts.

Sights

The main landmark is the Nové Město nad Metují Castle. The castle mixes Renaissance and early Baroque styles and is open to the public.

The castle forms a unified architectural unit with Husovo Square. The most significant monuments are Church of the Holy Trinity from 1519, the northern row of Renaissance houses, or the well in the middle of the square from the 16th century. The historic centre is surrounded by preserved town fortifications. The Zázvorka guarding tower serves nowadays as a gallery.

Outside the historic centre is the monastery complex. The Monastery of the Merciful Brothers with Church of the Nativity of the Virgin Mary and Loreta Chapel was founded by Walter Leslie in 1692. Other notable building is Church of the Holy Spirit in Krčín, built in the early Gothic style in the 13th century.

Notable people
Philipp Josef Pick (1834–1910), Austrian dermatologist
Karel Klapálek (1893–1984), general
Jan Milíč Lochman (1922–2004), Czech-Swiss theologian
Vladimír Suchánek (1933–2021), graphic designer
Jiří Macháně (1940–2023), cinematographer
Pavel Černý (born 1962), footballer

Twin towns – sister cities

Nové Město nad Metují is twinned with:
 Duszniki-Zdrój, Poland
 Gârnic, Romania
 Hilden, Germany
 Warrington, England, United Kingdom

References

External links

Official website 
Nové Město nad Metují Castle official website

Cities and towns in the Czech Republic
Populated places established in 1501